The Ven. Gavin Berkeley (1626-1691) was appointed in 1652 by Oliver Cromwell to administer the ecclesiastical needs of the district around Killaloe: he was  Archdeacon of Killaloe from 1661 to 1667.

Notes

Archdeacons of Killaloe
1650s in Ireland
1660s in Ireland